The Origin of the Feces is the second studio album by the American gothic metal band Type O Negative, released in 1992.

Recording and production
The album was recorded in a studio but produced to sound "live" by adding crowd noises, banter with the fictitious audience, and even a song stopping because the venue supposedly had received a bomb threat. This was done to simulate the controversy the band faced during the European leg of their Slow, Deep and Hard tour. The band is known among fans for weaving this type of humour into their often gloomy music.

Album content
The album is composed primarily of slightly altered, re-recorded versions of tracks that had appeared already on Slow, Deep and Hard. Four of the song's titles have been deliberately renamed:

- "Unsuccessfully Coping with the Natural Beauty of Infidelity" = "I Know You're Fucking Someone Else"
- "Gravitational Constant: G = 6.67 x 10⁻⁸ cm⁻³ gm⁻¹ sec⁻²" = "Gravity"
- "Prelude to Agony" = "Pain"
- "Xero Tolerance" = "Kill You Tonight"

One song, "Are You Afraid", is an original composition that the band played live as an introduction to "Gravity" but never included on an official studio album. It foreshadows the gothic sound the band would adopt on their next album, Bloody Kisses.

This album also started the tradition of Type O Negative recording cover songs performed in their distinct, gothic metal sound. The album included the band's cover of Billy Roberts' "Hey Joe" which was made famous by the Jimi Hendrix Experience. The song was retitled "Hey Pete" for its inclusion on The Origin Of The Feces and it featured re-worked lyrics. The new title and revised lyics were references to Type O Negative frontman Peter Steele. The reprise of "Kill You Tonight" includes a sample of the closing piano strike from The Beatles' "A Day in the Life". The remastered 1994 reissue of The Origin Of The Feces also included a bonus cover track of Black Sabbath's "Paranoid" (which also contains the main riff of Black Sabbath's "Iron Man" midway through). This cover was originally recorded for inclusion on the 1994 compilation album "Nativity in Black: A Tribute to Black Sabbath" however it was scrapped from the project when a more prominent band signed on and requested they  perform "Paranoid" on the album. As a result, Type O Negative was forced to record another Black Sabbath song in order to be included on the tribute album. The band settled on the song, "Black Sabbath" itself and ironically Black Sabbath themselves were very impressed with Type O Negative's take on the song. Original Black Sabbath drummer, Bill Ward cited Type O Negative's performance as his favorite from the album.

In another instance of the band's sense of humor, circus impresario P. T. Barnum is credited as a co-producer for the record, despite the fact that he had been dead for over 100 years at the time the album was released.

Packaging
The original cover of the album has a close-up of Steele's anus. This was changed for the re-issue two years later, to a green and black version of the 1493 painting by Michael Wolgemut, The Dance of Death. The album's title is an obvious pun and a reference to Charles Darwin's On the Origin of Species.

In addition to the re-issue's cover, other artwork included in the album's sleeve/liner notes is the famous 1498 woodcut by Albrecht Dürer, The Four Horsemen of the Apocalypse.

Track listing
All lyrics and music by Peter Steele, except where noted.

Credits
 Peter Steele – lead vocals, bass guitar
 Kenny Hickey – backing vocals, co-lead vocals (on "Hey Pete"), electric guitar
 Josh Silver – backing vocals, keyboards, sound effects
 Sal Abruscato – drums, percussion
 Johnny Kelly – drums, percussion (on "Paranoid")

Charts

References

Type O Negative albums
1992 albums
Roadrunner Records albums